The Bakersfield Blaze were a minor league baseball team in Bakersfield, California. They played in the Class A – Advanced California League. They played their home games at Sam Lynn Ballpark. Opened in 1941, the stadium is well known for facing the setting sun and its shallow 354-foot center field fence, and seats 3,500 fans.

Near the end of the 2008 season, it was rumored that the Blaze would move to the Carolina League after the following season. However, Minor League Baseball president Pat O'Conner announced in February 2009 that they would remain in the California League.

The Blaze were sold to local Bakersfield businessmen Gene Voiland and Chad Hathaway just prior to the 2012 season. The new ownership renovated Sam Lynn Ballpark in time for Opening Day and announced in November 2012 that a new ballpark would be ready for the 2014 season. However, financing plans for a new stadium failed to meet the $30 million target and team ownership was reclaimed by former owner D. G. Elmore. As a result, the California League began looking for a new home for the team. However, in August 2016, the California League announced that the Blaze would not be returning for the 2017 season. The team played its final game on September 12, 2016.

The Fayetteville Woodpeckers replaced the Blaze at the Advanced-A level, however the Fayetteville Woodpeckers are not the continuation of the Blaze.

Year-by-year record

Notable former Bakersfield players

Baseball Hall of Fame alumni

Pedro Martínez (1991) Inducted, 2015
Mike Piazza (1991) Inducted, 2016
 Don Sutton (1987) Inducted 1998

Notable alumni

 Pedro Astacio (1990)
 Elvis Andrus (2007) 2x MLB All-Star
 Richard Bleier (2009)
 Larry Bowa (1967) 5x MLB All-Star; 2001 NL Manager of the Year
 Phil Bradley (1982) MLB All-Star
Johnny Callison (1957) 4x MLB All-Star
Ron Cey (1969) 6x MLB All-Star; 1981 World Series MVP
John Danks (2005)
Chris Davis (2007) MLB All-Star; 2013 AL RBI Leader
Ivan DeJesus (1971, 1973) 
 Don Demeter (1954) 
Rick Dempsey (1993, Mgr) 1983 World Series MVP
Scott Feldman (2005)
Jonny Gomes (2002)
 Juan Guzman (1987) MLB All-Star; 1996 AL ERA Leader
 Tom Goodwin (1990) 
Yasmani Grandal (2011) MLB All-Star
 Juan Guzman (1987) MLB All-Star; 1996 AL ERA Leader
Josh Hamilton (2002) 5x MLB All-Star; 2010 AL MVP
 Jason Hammel (2004)
 Orel Hershiser (1991) 1988 NL Cy Young Award
 Derek Holland (2008)
 Todd Hollandsworth (1992) 1996 NL Rookie of the Year
 Jay Howell (1992) 3x MLB All-Star
Tommy Hunter (2008)
 Grant Jackson (1962-) MLB All-Star
Eric Karros (1989) 1992 NL Rookie of the Year
 Kevin Kennedy (1987, Mgr)
 Lee Lacy (1970) 
Mark Langston (1982) 4x MLB All-Star
 Paul LoDuca (1994) 4x MLB All-Star
Mike Marshall (1962) 2x MLB All-Star; 1974 NL Cy Young Award
Ramón Martínez (1986)
 Raul Mondesi (1991) MLB All-Star; 1994 NL Rookie of the Year
 Jon Moscot (2013)
Joe Nathan 6x MLB All-Star
 Jeff Nelson (1986) MLB All-Star
 Graig Nettles (1986, Mgr) 6x MLB All-Star
Hideo Nomo 1995 NL Rookie of the Year
José Offerman (1989) 2x MLB All-Star
 Tyler O'Neill (2015) 
 Tom Paciorek (1968) MLB All-Star
Henry Rodríguez (1989) MLB All-Star
 Jerry Royster (1971)
 Bill Russell (1968) 3x MLB All-Star
James Shields (2003-2004) MLB All-Star
 Mario Soto (1988) 3x MLB All-Star
 Rick Sutcliffe (1975) 3x MLB All-Star; 1979 NL Rookie of the Year; 1982 AL ERA Leader; 1984 NL Cy Young Award
John Tudor (1989)
Edinson Vólquez (2006-2007)
John Wetteland (1986) 3x MLB All-Star; 1996 World Series MVP
C. J. Wilson (2005) 2x MLB All-Star
 Rick Wise (1963) 2x MLB All-Star
 Todd Worrell (1993) 1986 NL Rookie of the Year
Steve Yeager (1969)

References

External links
Bakersfield Blaze official website

Baseball teams established in 1941
Baseball teams disestablished in 2016
Sports in Bakersfield, California
Cincinnati Reds minor league affiliates
Texas Rangers minor league affiliates
Tampa Bay Devil Rays minor league affiliates
San Francisco Giants minor league affiliates
Los Angeles Dodgers minor league affiliates
Seattle Mariners minor league affiliates
Philadelphia Phillies minor league affiliates
Chicago Cubs minor league affiliates
Brooklyn Dodgers minor league affiliates
Detroit Tigers minor league affiliates
Cleveland Guardians minor league affiliates
Defunct California League teams
Professional baseball teams in California
1941 establishments in California
2016 disestablishments in California
Defunct baseball teams in California